Vijay is an Indian actor who works in Tamil cinema. He made his cinematic debut in 1984 with Vetri, directed by his father, S. A. Chandrasekhar. After appearing in Chandrasekhar's films as an child artist, Vijay made his debut as a lead actor with Naalaiya Theerpu (1992) at the age of 18. He followed it with a supporting role opposite Vijayakanth in Sendhoorapandi (1993). Vijay went on to play lead roles in his father's directorial ventures such as Rasigan (1994) and Deva (1995). Most of those films were successful commercially.

Vijay's first breakthrough was in 1996 with Vikraman's romance film, Poove Unakkaga. His subsequent films, Vasanth's Nerrukku Ner (1997) and Fazil's Kadhalukku Mariyadhai (1997), were critically and commercially successful. His performance in the latter won him the Tamil Nadu State Film Award for Best Actor. Thulladha Manamum Thullum (1999), where he played a passionate singer gained him the reputation of a romantic hero.

Vijay began the new millennium with critically and commercially successful films such as Kushi and Priyamaanavale. The following year, he appeared in three films: Friends, Badri and Shahjahan. All three were box office successes; barring successful ventures Thamizhan, Youth and Bagavathi (all three released in 2002), his subsequent films Vaseegara and Pudhiya Geethai were released. While Vaseegara was a moderate success and received praise for his comic-timing, Puthiya Geethai received negative reviews and underperformed at the box office. The success of his masala film Thirumalai (2003), changed his on-screen persona to that of an action hero. He appeared next as a kabaddi player in Ghilli (2004), which went on to become the most commercially successful Tamil film of the year. His performance as a sword-smith in the masala film Thirupaachi (2005) earned him a special prize at the Tamil Nadu State Film Awards. He continued to achieve commercial success with Sivakasi (2005) and Pokkiri (2007). The latter garnered him a Filmfare Award nomination for Best Actor. Barring Vettaikaaran'''s box office success, all of his subsequent releases from Azhagiya Tamil Magan (2007), where he played dual roles for the first time in his career, to Villu (2009) were average successes; his 50th film, Sura (2010), managed to recover only its production cost.

In 2011 Vijay's career prospects improved after he was praised for his role as a bodyguard in Kaavalan. Velayudham in which, he appeared as a masked superhero was commercially successful worldwide. The following year he appeared in two films: as a college student in Nanban and an army officer in Thuppakki. His performances in both films received positive critical feedback, with the latter earning him a Best Actor nomination at the 60th Filmfare Awards South. He followed that with A. L. Vijay's Thalaivaa (2013) and the multi-starrer Jilla (2014) which was commercially successful. He teamed up with Murugadoss again for the action film Kaththi (2014). The film, which had Vijay playing dual roles as a thief and an idealist, became one of the highest-grossing Tamil films of that year; his performances earned him critics praise. In his next film, Chimbu Deven's fantasy Puli (2015), he featured again in dual roles; it was an overseas success. The following year, he played a police officer in Atlee's Theri. The film had one of the biggest openings in Tamil cinema and was a major commercial success. Vijay's performance won him South Indian International Movie Awards. He played triple roles for the first time in Mersal (2017), his second collaboration with Atlee. In addition to garnering a UK Award for Best Actor, the film collected 2.5 billion. Vijay earned positive critical acclaim for Bairavaa (2017) and Sarkar (2018). He also starred in films Bigil (2019), Master (2021), Beast (2022) and Varisu (2023) which received mixed reviews, but became commercially successful.

 Films All films are in Tamil, unless otherwise noted.''

See also 
List of awards and nominations received by Vijay
List of songs sung by Vijay

Notes

References

External links 
 

Indian filmographies
Male actor filmographies
Filmography